Agonopterix epichersa is a moth in the family Depressariidae. It was described by Edward Meyrick in 1914. It is found in Sichuan, China.

The wingspan is about 22 mm. The forewings are light fuscous, slightly rosy tinged and finely sprinkled with whitish and with scattered dark fuscous scales. There are about seven small indistinct rather dark fuscous dots along the costa and two indistinct rather dark fuscous spots in the disc about two-fifths. There is a small cloudy fuscous spot towards the costa in the middle. The hindwings are light rosy fuscous sprinkled with whitish.

References

Moths described in 1914
Agonopterix
Moths of Asia